Rohan-Rohan is an Indian music director duo of Hindi and Marathi films, various television series, ad films and web series. The duo consists of Rohan Pradhan and Rohan Gokhale and is known for their work in Marathi and Hindi films including Ventilator (2016 film), Sanju, Bucket List (2018 film), and Thackeray (film)  among many others.

Early life 
Rohan Pradhan hails from Mumbai. He started his music journey at a very early age, singing and learning piano. Before joining hands with Rohan Gokhale, he worked as an independent composer and singer for many Marathi films.

Rohan Gokhale was born and grew up in Nagpur. He is an engineer. Gokhale and Pradhan teamed up in 2014 to form Rohan-Rohan. 

The Duo is co-producers of Marathi film 'Bardo' which won two National Awards, in Best film and Best Female Singer categories for their song 'Raan Petla'.

Filmography

Films

TV series

Web series and films

References

External links
 
 

Hindi-language film directors
Living people
Music directors
Year of birth missing (living people)